Barbara Madsen (born 1952) is an American jurist and a current Associate Justice of the Washington Supreme Court. She joined the court in 1993 as the first woman to be popularly elected to the Court in Washington state history. She was re-elected in 1998, 2004, and 2010, and 2016. In her years on the Washington Supreme Court, Madsen has sat in judgement on thousands of cases.

On November 5, 2009, Barbara Madsen was unanimously elected by her peers to serve as Chief Justice of the Washington Supreme Court. She was sworn in as Chief Justice on January 11, 2010, replacing retiring Chief Justice Gerry L. Alexander. She served two terms as Chief Justice, the second longest serving in Washington state history.

Madsen is a native of Renton, Washington, and graduated from Hazen High School. In 1974, she received her undergraduate degree from the University of Washington.  In 1977, she earned her Juris Doctor from Gonzaga University School of Law.

After completing law school, Madsen worked as a public defender in King County and Snohomish County. In 1982, she joined the Seattle City Attorney's Office and was appointed Special Prosecutor in 1984. Seattle Mayor Charles Royer appointed Madsen in 1988 to the Seattle Municipal Court bench. After serving as the Presiding Judge of the Seattle Municipal Court, she ran for the Washington Supreme Court in 1992 to fill the vacancy left by retiring Justice Fred H. Dore.

In October 2018, Madsen concurred when the majority invalidated the state's death penalty. The court found its imposition to be racially biased and therefore in violation of the Constitution of Washington.

See also
List of female state supreme court justices

References

External links
Re-Elect Chief Justice Madsen Campaign Website

1952 births
Living people
Chief Justices of the Washington Supreme Court
Gonzaga University School of Law alumni
People from Renton, Washington
Public defenders
University of Washington alumni
Justices of the Washington Supreme Court
Women chief justices of state supreme courts in the United States
20th-century American judges
21st-century American judges
20th-century American women judges
21st-century American women judges